In April 2003, the United States drew up a list of most-wanted Iraqis, consisting of the 55 members of the deposed Ba'athist Iraqi regime whom they most wanted to capture. The list was turned into a set of playing cards for distribution to United States-led Coalition troops. Later, in 2003, the list was renumbered so that it mostly conformed to the order of the playing cards (see most-wanted Iraqi playing cards).

List 
 
 Total 55
 Dead: 32
 Imprisoned: 6
 Released: 13
 At large: 4

See also 

 2003 invasion of Iraq
 2003 Iraq war timeline
 Most-wanted Iraqi playing cards
 Torture and murder in Iraq
USA kill or capture strategy in Iraq

References

External links
 "Personality Identification Playing Cards" - a U.S. Department of Defense page showing the most wanted Iraqi playing cards
 "'Chemical Ali' sentenced to death in Iraq" - news article

most-wanted
Most wanted lists